The Dernbach is a river in the district of Südliche Weinstraße in the German state of Rhineland-Palatinate. It is 7.46 kilometres long and forms the left-hand, northern headstream of the Eisbach.

Course 
The southern part of the Dernbach runs through the central Palatine Forest. Its source is located on the eastern slopes of the Langentalkopf, the summit of which is 526 m above sea level. From its origin, the Dernbach flows in a mainly southerly direction and picks up the waters of several other small streams as well as the Waltersbach, which is just several hundred metres long and joins it from the north, before reaching the village of Ramberg. In the village itself the Ohlsbach empties into it from the east. Next, the Dernbach flows through its eponymous village where, at the northern edge of the settlement, it is joined by the Leinbach coming from the east.

Below the Vogelstockerhof farm, in the parish of Annweiler am Trifels, the Dernbach merges with the Eußerbach, which arrives from the right coming from the northwest, to form the Eisbach, a feeder of the Rhine tributary, the Queich.

Sights 
In the forests around the Dernbach valley lie the ruins of three castles: Meistersel, Neuscharfeneck and Ramburg; and on the other side of the Modenbach valley are the ruins of a fourth: Frankenfelsen.

References 

Rivers of Rhineland-Palatinate
Südliche Weinstraße
Rivers and lakes of the Palatinate Forest
Rivers of Germany